Voortrekkers were Dutch-speaking settlers in South Africa who migrated eastward as part of the Great Trek.

Voortrekkers may also refer to:

 Voortrekker (yacht), a racing yacht
 Voortrekkers (youth organisation), a youth organisation
 Voortrekker High School (disambiguation)
 "The Voortrekkers", a short story in The Dark Between the Stars by Poul Anderson